The Flaming Frontier is a 1926 American silent Western film directed by Edward Sedgwick and starring Hoot Gibson. It was produced and distributed by Universal Pictures.

Cast

Preservation status
The film survives in an incomplete and / or abridged form.

References

External links

 
 

1926 films
Films directed by Edward Sedgwick
Universal Pictures films
1926 Western (genre) films
American black-and-white films
Silent films in color
Silent American Western (genre) films
1920s American films